Daniel Jiménez Román (born November 21, 1969 in Camuy, Puerto Rico) is a former Puerto Rican professional boxer. He is best known for having won the WBO title as a pro.

Pro
Jimenez, known as "La Cobra", turned pro in 1988, losing his first fight to Wilfredo Vargas. In 1993 he captured the WBO super bantamweight title with a decision win over Duke McKenzie and defended it four times before losing it to Marco Antonio Barrera in 1995. He moved down in weight after the loss and defeated WBO bantamweight title holder Alfred Kotey by decision. He defended the belt once before losing it to Robbie Regan the following year. He retired in 2002 after several losses late in his career.

On September 3, 1994, Daniel Jiménez established a world record for the quickest knockout in a championship fight, defeating Harald Geier in 17 seconds.

See also
List of Puerto Ricans
List of Puerto Rican boxing world champions
List of bantamweight boxing champions
List of super-bantamweight boxing champions

External links
 

1969 births
Living people
People from Camuy, Puerto Rico
Olympic boxers of Puerto Rico
Bantamweight boxers
Super-bantamweight boxers
Featherweight boxers
World bantamweight boxing champions
World super-bantamweight boxing champions
World Boxing Organization champions
Puerto Rican male boxers